Televizija Republike Srpske  (Cyrillic: Телевизија Републике Српске, "Television of Republika Srpska"; locally known just as RTRS (РТРС)) is a Bosnian entity level public mainstream TV channel operated by RTRS. The program is broadcast on a daily basis, 24 hours from RTRS headquarters located in Banja Luka. The radio and television program is mainly produced in Serbian and Cyrillic. This television channel broadcasts a variety of programs such as news, talk shows, documentaries, sports, movies, mosaic, children's programs, etc.

See also

 Radio Televizija Republike Srpske
 RTVFBiH
 BHRT

External links

References

Mass media in Banja Luka
Publicly funded broadcasters
Television stations in Bosnia and Herzegovina
Multilingual broadcasters
Television channels and stations established in 1992
Radio Televizija Republike Srpske